Zoran Arsenić (born 2 June 1994) is a Croatian professional footballer who plays as a centre-back for Raków Częstochowa.

Club career
Coming from the NK Osijek academy, Arsenić was ceded to NK Višnjevac during his first U19 year, where he gathered a couple of senior caps in the Treća HNL Istok. Returning to Osijek, he made his first team debut on 22 June 2013, as a starter in a 1–2 home loss against NK Lokomotiva. Not long afterwards, he was sent on loan to Druga HNL side HNK Segesta, where he spent most of the 2013–14 season, and the following season to NK Sesvete, playing in the same tier. He settled as a regular at NK Osijek at the start of the 2015–16 season.

On 4 January 2017 he signed a contract with Wisła Kraków valid from 1 July 2017.

On 17 May 2018 he signed a contract extension that tied him to Wisła until 2022. However, due to Wisła's regulatory difficulties his contract was dissolved by mutual consent in January 2019.

On 16 January 2019 he signed a three-and-half year contract with Jagiellonia Białystok.

Career statistics

Honours

Club
Raków Częstochowa
Polish Cup: 2020–21, 2021–22
 Polish Super Cup: 2021, 2022

References

External links
 
 
 

1994 births
Living people
Footballers from Osijek
Association football central defenders
Croatian footballers
NK Osijek players
HNK Segesta players
NK Sesvete players
Wisła Kraków players
Jagiellonia Białystok players
HNK Rijeka players
Raków Częstochowa players
Croatian Football League players
Ekstraklasa players
Croatian expatriate footballers
Expatriate footballers in Poland
Croatian expatriate sportspeople in Poland